William Cawley (born 6 September 1997) is an English professional boxer. He was the 2016 ABA flyweight champion and won a silver medal at the 2018 EU Championships, and also competed at the 2017 and 2018 World Series of Boxing, representing the British Lionhearts.

References

External links

English male boxers
Sportspeople from Oldham
Flyweight boxers
Living people
1997 births
England Boxing champions